Fort Davis National Historic Site is a United States National Historic Site located in the unincorporated community of Fort Davis, Jeff Davis County, Texas. Located within the Davis Mountains of West Texas, the historic site was established in 1961 to protect one of the best remaining examples of a United States Army fort in the southwestern United States.

History
Established in October 1854 along the Limpia Creek at Painted Comanche Camp by Bvt. Maj. Gen. Persifor Frazer Smith, Fort Davis was named after Jefferson Davis who later became  President of the Confederate States of America.  "Hoping to protect the garrison from winter northers, Smith tucked the fort into a canyon flanked on three sides by sheer rock walls."  Commanding the post was 8th Infantry Regiment commander Lt. Col. Washington Seawell.

Other forts in the frontier fort system were Forts Griffin, Concho, Belknap, Chadbourne, Stockton, Richardson, Bliss, McKavett, Clark, McIntosh, Inge, and Phantom Hill in Texas, and Fort Sill in Oklahoma.   "Sub posts or intermediate stations" also were used, including Bothwick's Station on Salt Creek between Fort Richardson and Fort Belknap, Camp Wichita near Buffalo Springs between Fort Richardson and Red River Station, and Mountain Pass between Fort Concho and Fort Griffin.

From 1854 to 1891, Fort Davis was strategically located to protect emigrants, mail coaches, and freight wagons on the trans-Pecos portion of the San Antonio-El Paso Road and the Chihuahua Trail, and to control activities on the southern stem of the Great Comanche War Trail and Mescalero Apache war trails.

The fort was evacuated in April 1861 under orders from General David E. Twiggs at the start of the Civil War.  During John R. Baylor's invasion of New Mexico, only 20 Confederate States Army troops defended the fort. On the night of 4 August 1861, Mescalero Apaches raided a nearby cattle pen, and during the pursuit on 11 August, Lt. Reuben E. Mays and all but one of his 13-man patrol were killed in an ambush.  This defeat convinced Baylor to staff the fort with three officers and 70 enlisted men.  The Confederates evacuated the fort and all other posts west of Fort Clark in August 1862.

Fort Davis is important in understanding the presence of African Americans in the West and in the frontier military because the 24th and 25th U.S. Infantry regiments and the 9th and 10th U.S. Cavalry regiments, all-black regiments (known as the buffalo soldiers), which were established after the Civil War, were stationed at the post.  Lt. Col. Wesley Merritt led Troops C, F, H, and I of the 9th Cavalry in reoccupying the fort on 29 June 1867.  They rebuilt the fort, using limestone and adobe, outside the canyon walls.

Preservation
Today, 24 restored historic buildings and over 100 ruins and foundations are part of Fort Davis National Historic Site. Five of the historic buildings have been refurbished to the 1880s, making it easy for visitors to envision themselves being at the fort at the height of its development. A self-guided tour of the fort begins at the site's visitor center. Living history demonstrations are common during the summer.

Fort Davis National Historic Site was authorized as a unit of the National Park System in 1961, and was designated a National Historic Landmark in 1960.

A memorial at Fort Davis honors the heroism of Indian Emily, the fictional subject of a popular legend.  The actress Jolene Brand portrayed "Indian Emily", who saved the fort from an Apache attack, in the 1959 episode of the same name on the syndicated television anthology series, Death Valley Days, hosted by Stanley Andrews. Emily adopts the white man's ways but flees when a young officer, Tom Easton (Burt Metcalfe), whom she loves prepares to marry another. She returns to warn the fort of a pending Apache attack but dies of a gunshot wound fired in error. Meg Wyllie played Tom's compassionate mother, Mrs. Easton.

Gallery

See also

Henry Flipper
William Rufus Shafter
National Register of Historic Places listings in Jeff Davis County, Texas
List of National Historic Landmarks in Texas

References

External links

 Fort Davis National Historic Site
 More on Ft. Davis from NPS, includes photo gallery
 Photos of Fort Davis National Historic Site from the Portal to Texas History
 Fort Davis, Texas Handbook of Texas Online
 San Antonio-El Paso Road
  Fort Davis, fortwiki.com
Film footage of Fort Davis from the Texas Archive of the Moving Image

National Historic Landmarks in Texas
Davis
National Historic Sites in Texas
Protected areas of Jeff Davis County, Texas
Museums in Jeff Davis County, Texas
Military and war museums in Texas
Protected areas established in 1961
1961 establishments in Texas
San Antonio–San Diego Mail Line
San Antonio–El Paso Road
Davis
National Register of Historic Places in Jeff Davis County, Texas
American Civil War on the National Register of Historic Places
Stagecoach stops in the United States